Tsihombe (or: Tsiombe) is a municipality in Androy Region, Madagascar. It is situated at the Manambovo River and the Route nationale 10 and about 30 km north of the southernmost point of the island, Tanjona Vohimena (Cape Sainte Marie).

Although the majority of the population are primarily adherents of Christianity and traditional beliefs, Tsihombe is the only town in the Androy region of Madagascar that has a mosque and a permanent Imam, although tensions between religious communities are low.

Roads
Tsihombe is crossed by the National road 10 that is largely unpaved.

References

Populated places in Androy